The 1994 Armenian Cup was the third edition of the Armenian Cup, a football competition. In 1994, the tournament had 16 participants, none of which were reserve teams.

Results

Preliminary round

The match was scheduled to be played on 27 March 1994.

|}

First round

Ararat Yerevan received a bye to the quarter finals.

The matches were played on 2 and 3 April 1994.

|}

Quarter-finals

The first legs were played in April 1994. The second legs were played in April 1994.

|}

Semi-finals

The first legs were played in April 1994. The second legs were played on 1 May 1994.

|}

Final

See also
 1994 Armenian Premier League

External links
 1994 Armenian Cup at rsssf.com

Armenian Cup seasons
Armenia
Armenian Cup, 1994